Vaiano Cremasco is a comune (municipality) in the Province of Cremona in the Italian region Lombardy, located about  southeast of Milan and about  northwest of Cremona.

Vaiano Cremasco borders the following municipalities: Bagnolo Cremasco, Crespiatica, Monte Cremasco, Palazzo Pignano, Trescore Cremasco.

Twin towns
Vaiano Cremasco is twinned with:
	
  Veigy-Foncenex, France
  Puerto Padre, Cuba

References

External links
 Official website

Cities and towns in Lombardy